Blackburn with Darwen tPCT was an English National Health Service primary care trust, responsible for commissioning & purchasing of health care in Blackburn with Darwen in Lancashire. It came under the North West of England's NHS strategic health authority (SHA). It was abolished in April 2013.

History
Blackburn with Darwen PCT was formed in 2000 by order of the Secretary of State for Health Alan Milburn by means of the National Health Service Act 1977, and is co-terminus with Blackburn with Darwen Borough Council. It became a teaching PCT in 2007, having survived a series of mergers intact.

Between 1982 and 1994 the local healthcare fundholders for this area was known as the Blackburn, Hyndburn and Ribble Valley District Health Authority, which came under the Lancashire Area Health Authority (which has now been replaced by the North West Region SHA). It was then reorganised into part of the East Lancashire District Health Authority. Under this administration, the function of fundholders was known as the Blackburn with Darwen primary care group sub committee, before being replaced yet again by the creation of the present trust in 2000.

Responsibilities
The PCT served a population of approximately 163,000 people and had three core responsibilities:
Engaging with its local population to improve health and well-being.
To collaborate with GP's to commission a comprehensive equitable range of high quality, responsive and efficient where this gives the best value.
To directly provide high quality, responsive and efficient services where this gives the best value.

Geographical spread
The Trust was responsible for the commissioning of healthcare on all of the following sites:

Source: Department of Health. NHS Choices: Blackburn With Darwen PCT

Public Health Strategy
The Blackburn with Darwen area suffers from severe health inequalities., in particular there have been reports of an increase in cases of rickets in the area.
In response to this the Living Better, Living Longer strategy was launched in 2007.
The purpose of the strategy is to:
Encourage the Trust, its partners and the population of Blackburn with Darwen to do what it can to live better and longer lives
To identify what needs to happen with an implementation plan that will make a positive impact on the health and well-being of the Blackburn with Darwen population.

This is accomplished by a process called  commissioning.  This is defined as:  The strategic activity of assessing needs, resources and current services, and developing a strategy to make best use of available resources to meet identified needs.

Once this has been completed, the actual purchasing of health services needed to meet the needs and priorities identified can go a head. The definition used for purchasing is: The operational activity set within the context of commissioning, of applying resources to buy services to meet needs, either at a macro/population level or at a micro/individual level.

The Jarman Centre
The Jarman Centre, a facility of the Teaching PCT, located on James Street Blackburn was one of the first Health Promotion Units in England to respond to the public health challenges of HIV / AIDS. Under the direction of Peter Cash, the Jarman Centre was at the forefront of innovative approaches to combat the spread of HIV infections. It promoted primary and secondary prevention initiatives in the field of sexual health and substance misuse; both recognised as key transmission routes for HIV and other blood-borne viruses such as hepatitis B and hepatitis C. Through primary prevention initiatives the Jarman Centre established comprehensive training programmes aimed at improving the awareness and education of public and voluntary sector workers around substance misuse and sexual health issues which affect individuals and communities. It also established effective education and prevention programmes with service users, including the development of comprehensive harm reduction services and client education interventions. These continue to this day, and are continually reviewed and assessed to ensure that current projects are relevant to the health needs of the community.

Examples of current work include: outreach initiatives to provide hepatitis B vaccination to the homeless, sex worker targeted outreach, [led by Danny Leech and the NX team] including engagement with injectors of performance-enhancing drugs to raise awareness of the many potentially serious health and social consequences of misuse and the development of an interactive distance learning resource to raise awareness of primary and secondary prevention issues in relation to hepatitis C.

Another important aspect of Jarman Centre work is inter-agency collaboration with other key services across Blackburn with Darwen and East Lancashire. In this regard the Jarman Centre has over recent years organised and delivered a range of seminars and conferences covering issues such as effective responses to cannabis use, vascular care of injecting drug users, HIV prevention in the community whilst also developing inter agency harm reduction strategies to tackle substance misuse across Blackburn with Darwen and east Lancashire. The Jarman Centre has recently been commissioned to provide a comprehensive harm reduction service for injecting drug users based at Burnley House, Westgate, Burnley. This mirrors the harm reduction service operating from the Jarman Centre in Blackburn. All the pharmacy based needle exchange programmes across Blackburn with Darwen and East Lancashire are co-ordinated by the Jarman Centre.

Monitoring and Assessment of Services

The PCT is also responsible for monitoring and assessment of these services whilst they are being provided to ensure that the service providers are adhering to the plan laid out, to the agreed standards of care and are providing value for money.

References

External links 
 Blackburn with Darwen tPCT website. Accessed 2007-01-17
 Blackburn with Darwen Health and Wellbeing website. Accessed 2007-01-17
 The Patient and Public Involvement (PPI) Forum: Blackburn with Darwen. Accessed 2007-01-17
 Department of Health Performance Tables (2006). Blackburn With Darwen PCT – Ordinary and Day Case Admissions Combined. Accessed 2007-01-18

Defunct NHS trusts
Organisations based in Lancashire
Health in Lancashire
Blackburn